is a vertical scrolling shooter video game developed and published by T&E Soft for the Nintendo Game Boy exclusively in Japan on December 18, 1992.

Story
Sometime in the 21st century, humanity leaves Earth for Mars due to a legacy of environmental pollution on their home planet. Nobody inhabited the Earth until a group of super-intelligent robots from another galaxy suddenly took over. They have changed the once-proud planet into something that they can inhabit on. An impromptu liberation army was set up to save the planet from the robots; who somehow got rid of the pollution on Earth.

Gameplay

The gameplay is done in a style similar to Gradius and R-Type.

Players proceed through the game; shooting enemies while dodging obstacles and collecting power-ups for their shooting weapons. The game uses the basic configuration for the ship's control; with one button doing the shooting. As a complex scrolling shooter, this game attempts to emulate multiple dimensions using the limitations of the Game Boy console. The parallax backgrounds and elaborate detailing in the sprites help to create a unique Game Boy experience; any distinctions between the scenery and the bad guys are clearly shown through different shades of the same color.

A higher degree of difficulty exists in this game as opposed to most Game Boy scrolling shooters of that era. Timing is essential to clearing most stages and for defeating the end-level bosses.

There are five levels in the game. While the first four levels can be freely chosen, the fifth level in the game is unlocked after finishing the first four levels.

Video gaming website Blame the Control Pad praises Chikyū Kaihō Gun ZAS for its innovative gameplay along with its integrated levels and player-friendly control scheme.

Credits
 Tadashi Nakatsuji (Director, Sub Program, Sound Effects)
 M. Nagashima (Main Program)
 M. Takahashi (Main Designer)
 T. Ishida, S. Nishimura (Sub Designers)
 Yumi Kinoshita, Shigekazu Kamaki (Music)

See also
Chikyū
SolarStriker

References

External links
Chikyū Kaihō Gun ZAS (review by Chris Covell)
Chikyū Kaihō Gun ZAS at Giant Bomb
Chikyū Kaihō Gun ZAS at GameFAQs

1992 video games
Game Boy-only games
Japan-exclusive video games
Science fiction video games
Scrolling shooters
T&E Soft games
Video games set in the 21st century
Game Boy games
Video games developed in Japan